Hisonotus prata is a species of catfish in the family Loricariidae. It is a freshwater species native to South America, where it occurs in the Taquari River drainage and the Lagoa dos Patos system. It reaches 3.3 cm (1.3 inches) SL.

References 

Otothyrinae
Fish described in 2011